Jules Masselis (Ledegem, 19 November 1886 – Roeselare, 29 July 1965) was a Belgian professional road bicycle racer, who won two stages in the Tour de France and was leading the general classification for two nonconsecutive days.

Major results

1908
Deinze
Omloop van het Houtland
1909
Paris-Sedan
Paris-Liège
1910
Tour of Belgium, including 2 stages
1911
Tour de France
 Winner stage 2
 Leading classification for one day
1912
Paris-Menin
1913
Tour de France
 Winner stage 2
 Leading classification for one day
1926
Moorslede

External links 

Belgian male cyclists
1886 births
1965 deaths
Belgian Tour de France stage winners
People from Ledegem
Sportspeople from West Flanders